Arsinoea is an extinct genus of primates of which there is one known species, Arsinoea kallimos. Arsinoea kallimos from the late Eocene quarry L-41, Fayum Depression.

References

External links 
Arsinoea kallimos in the Paleobiology Database.

Prehistoric primate genera
Prehistoric monotypic mammal genera
Eocene primates
Eocene mammals of Africa
Fossil taxa described in 1992